The Philippines were the defending champions of the Men's Team competition of the 2011 Southeast Asian Games but lost to Indonesia in the final. Each tie was the best of three rubbers, two singles and one doubles match.

Medalists

Draw

Quarterfinals

Semifinals

Gold medal match

References
Draw
Team of Indonesia
Team of the Philippines
Team of Thailand
Team of Cambodia
SEAG2011 Start/Result Lists - Tennis

Men's Team